Jayro Rolando Campos León (born July 18, 1984) is an Ecuadorian former football defender.

Club career

Early career
Campos rose through the youth ranks at Guayaquil club Barcelona Sporting Club. However, he never played for the senior. He instead moved to Europe to play for Belgian club Gent in 2002. After a year and a half at the club in which he played 6 official games, he return to Ecuador to play for Quito based club Aucas. After one season with the club, he moved to cross-town rivals LDU Quito.

LDU Quito

2005-2009
Since joining Liga, he has become a key figure in the squad earning starting roles in important matches. He was part of the squad that won the two Ecuadorian titles (2005 Apertura and 2007). Campos participated in LDU Quito's unforgettable 2008 Copa Libertadores campaign where he became instrumental as a defender for the club, stopping the likes of Salvador Cabanas and Thiago Neves. He played an astounding 1st leg game against Fluminense, scoring the 3rd goal in their 4-2 home victory, and though he missed a penalty in the game-ending penalty shoot-out, he won the 2008 Copa Libertadores. He also won the 2009 Recopa Sudamericana against Internacional de Porto Alegre. His final title came against past finals rivals Fluminense, defeating them in aggregate 5-4, winning the 2009 Copa Sudamericana. Thus has become an unforgettable icon for the club's history taking LDU Quito to become Ecuador's best football club of the decade 2000-10.

Atlético Mineiro

2010-11
After five successful years at LDU Quito, Campos signed with Brazilian Club Atlético Mineiro on December 20, 2009.

Deportivo Quito

2011 Season
On 20 January 2011, Campos signed for Deportivo Quito on loan from Atlético Mineiro until the end of the season. Jayro Campos once again became an important factor into an Ecuadorian club. Their most impressive defender, Campos scored 3 goals and played a great 2011 Campeonato Ecuatoriano de Fútbol Serie A which led to qualifying for the finals of the season. Campos led the club's defense, shutting out Emelec, winning both legs 1-0 and thus crowned themselves 2011 Serie A champions.

Barcelona SC

2012 Season
In 2012 season, Campos signed a three-year contract with Barcelona SC.
After being teamed up with Ecuador national football team mate Frickson Erazo, the pairing led to Barcelona Sporting Club reaching their first finals in Ecuadorian football in 15 years. His ever impressive defensive displays has led to interests of clubs from England and France, though Campos has stated he wants to be league champions before he leaves the club.
On November 28, Campos became 2012 Serie A champion after SD Quito defeated Emelec 2-0, which helped Barcelona secure their first Ecuadorian league title since 1997, their 14th title in their history.

2013 Season

International career
Jairo has participated in Ecuador's 2010 World Cup qualifying campaign. He is a key player to Sixto Vizuete's starting line-up as a center back.

Honors
LDU Quito
Serie A (2): 2005 Apertura, 2007
Copa Libertadores (1): 2008
Recopa Sudamericana (1): 2009
Copa Sudamericana (1): 2009

Atlético Mineiro
Campeonato Mineiro (1): 2010

Deportivo Quito
Serie A (1): 2011

Barcelona SC
Serie A (1): 2012

References

External links
 Campos' FEF player card  
 
 

1984 births
Living people
People from Ibarra, Ecuador
Ecuadorian footballers
Association football defenders
Ecuador international footballers
Ecuadorian expatriate footballers
Expatriate footballers in Belgium
Expatriate footballers in Brazil
K.A.A. Gent players
S.D. Aucas footballers
L.D.U. Quito footballers
Clube Atlético Mineiro players
S.D. Quito footballers
Barcelona S.C. footballers
C.D. El Nacional footballers
Imbabura S.C. footballers